Arariel (also called Azariel) is an angel who, according to the rabbis of the Talmud, takes charge of the waters of the Earth. Fishermen invoke him so that they may take large fish.  Arariel has also traditionally been invoked as a cure for stupidity.

See also
 List of angels in theology

References

Angels in Judaism
Individual angels